Tashkent Planetarium is one of the newest constructions in Uzbekistan, which is visited by local people and by tourists. Tashkent Planetarium provides visitors with the opportunity to look at outer space, even in the morning, and enlarge their knowledge about the cosmos and the whole universe.

About 
Tashkent Planetarium was established by edict №649 of "Cabinet of Ministers of Republic Uzbekistan" on 3 November 2003, by decision of Tashkent city municipality of 7 November 2003 №748. The Planetarium is nowadays controlled by the controlling unit of Tashkent city municipality which focuses on culture and sport.

There are two main halls at the Planetarium, and each hall has its own functions. The first hall is mainly built for showing the Solar System and space, using Japanese technologies. The second hall contains artefacts, where visitors can learn more about specific planets and about Earth.

In 2008 a group of scientists at Tashkent Planetarium discovered the new planet "Samarkand".

See also 

State Museum of History of Uzbekistan
The Museum of Health Care of Uzbekistan
The Museum of Communication History in Uzbekistan
Museum of Arts of Uzbekistan
Tashkent Museum of Railway Techniques
Museum of Geology, Tashkent
Art Gallery of Uzbekistan
The Alisher Navoi State Museum of Literature
Museum of Victims of Political Repression in Tashkent
State Museum of Nature of Uzbekistan

References

External links 
Brochure about the planetarium
Article about the planetarium
Article about the planetarium in English
Article about the planetarium in English

Planetaria
Museums in Tashkent